Novooleksandrivka may refer to the following places in Ukraine:

 Novooleksandrivka, Popasna Raion, a village in Luhansk Oblast
 Novooleksandrivka, Oleksandrivka Raion, a village in Donetsk Oblast